Itacuruba is a city  in the state of Pernambuco, Brazil. The population in 2020, according with IBGE is 4,966 inhabitants and the total area is 430 km2.

Geography

 State - Pernambuco
 Region - São Francisco Pernambucano
 Boundaries - Belém de São Francisco   (N and W);  Bahia state  (S);  Floresta   (E).
 Area - 430.01 km2
 Elevation - 600 m
 Hydrography - Pajeú da caixa prego
 Vegetation - Caatinga hiperxerófila.
 Climate - Semi arid ( Sertão) hot
 Annual average temperature - 26.1 °C
 Distance to Recife - 900.8 km

Economy

The main economic activities in Itacuruba are based in agribusiness, especially creation of sheep, goats, cattle, chickens;  and plantations of onions and tomatoes.

Economic Indicators

Economy by Sector
2006

Health Indicators

References

Municipalities in Pernambuco